Ericameria nana is a North American species of flowering shrub in the family Asteraceae known by the common names dwarf goldenbush and rubberweed. It is native to the western United States from eastern California, southeastern Oregon, Nevada, Idaho, Utah, and southwestern Montana.

Ericameria nana grows along cliffs and rocky hillsides. This is a small shrub rarely reaching a maximum height of 50 cm (20 inches). It is covered in a foliage of sticky, curved, somewhat fleshy leaves about 1 centimeter (0.4 inches) long. The tips of its erect branches hold dense inflorescences of tiny flower heads with cream white to yellow disc and ray florets.

References

External links
Jepson Manual Treatment
United States Department of Agriculture Plants Profile
Calphotos Photo gallery, University of California

nana
Flora of the Northwestern United States
Flora of California
Flora of Nevada
Flora of the Great Basin
Plants described in 1840
Taxa named by Thomas Nuttall
Flora without expected TNC conservation status